Chicochoerus was an extinct member of the Hyotheriinae branch in the Suidae group that existed during the Miocene in Gers, France.It was named by Orliac et al. in 2006

References

Prehistoric Suidae
Miocene mammals of Asia
Miocene even-toed ungulates
Fossil taxa described in 2006
Prehistoric even-toed ungulate genera